Sitarganj is a city and a municipal board in Udham Singh Nagar district in the Indian state of Uttarakhand. Now it is home to the Integrated Industrial Estate Sitarganj (IIE) being developed by State Industrial Development Corporation of Uttarakhand Limited (SIDCUL).

Geography
It has an average elevation of 298 metres (978 feet). The city is located between three major water reservoirs naming:- Baigul Fish Reservoir, Dhora Reservoir and Nanak Sagar Reservoir which are used mainly for fisheries.

Baigul or Sukhi is a small tributary originating from the foothills of Kumaon Himalayas which was harnessed in 1967 for irrigation and flood control purpose. Baigul has an area of 2695 ha with an elevation of 211 m from the sea-level. The drainage area of 305 km2 is fed from southwest monsoon and local catchment of wooded forest. The Plankton species in Baigul is rich comprising 17 genera of green algae, 4 genera of blue-green algae, 10 genera of desmids and 14 genera of diatoms.

Nanak Sagar Dam has been constructed on river Saryu or deoha at Nanak Matta forming Nanak Sagar which adds up to the beauty of Nanakmatta which is a nearby town to sitarganj. Length of the Dam is 19700 m and Volume of the dam is 3833 * 10³ m³. Irrigation potential of This dam is 39200 hectares, built with an estimated cost of Rs. 36.3 million.

Dhora Dam is located near dineshpur constructed on river dhora, Length of the Dam is 9700 m and Volume of the dam is 50.700 * 10³ m³. Irrigation potential of This dam is 14600 hectares, built with an estimated cost of Rs. 11.1 million.

Sitarganj comes under the Terai Agro Climatic zone of Uttarakhand. Its regional connectivity (50 – 100 km) to major towns and cities: Rudrapur, Haldwani, Moradabad, Rampur, Kashipur and across states (300 – 500 km) to Uttar Pradesh, Delhi.

It is near to Nainital (a hill station) and Indo-Nepalese border. Sitarganj is closer to Nanak Matta gurudwara temple which is a famous shrine and big nanak sagar dam(12 km from Sitarganj).

Coca-Cola will set up a bottling plant in Sitarganj in 70 acres of land that will be provided by the Uttarakhand government.

Demographics
 India census, Sitarganj Tehsil had a population of 148266 in which 21893 population lives in main city.. Males constitute 53% of the population and females 47%. The SC and ST population is 14.3% and 13.1% respectively. In Sitarganj, 13% of the population is under 6 years of age. India census, Sitarganj has a low proportion of primary and secondary schools than the district aggregate, but still Sitarganj has an average literacy rate of 76%, higher than the national average of 59.5%: with male literacy of 79%, and female literacy being 66%.

Major markets
Ramleela Ground

Meena Bazaar

References

Cities and towns in Udham Singh Nagar district